Cuba competed at the 1992 Summer Olympics in Barcelona, Spain.  The nation returned to the Olympic Games after boycotting both the 1984 Games and the 1988 Games. 176 competitors, 126 men and 50 women, took part in 90 events in 16 sports.

Medalists

Competitors
The following is the list of number of competitors in the Games.

Athletics

Men's 4 × 400 m Relay
Lázaro Martínez, Héctor Herrera, Norberto Téllez, and Roberto Hernández   
 Heat — 2:59.13
 Final — 2:59.51 (→  Silver Medal)

Men's Marathon
 Alberto Cuba — did not finish (→ no ranking)

Men's Long Jump
Iván Pedroso
 Qualification — 8.07 m
 Final — 8.11 m (→ 4th place)
Jaime Jefferson
 Qualification — 8.09 m
 Final — 8.08 m (→ 5th place)

Men's Triple Jump
Yoelvis Quesada
 Qualification — 17.21 m
 Final — 17.18 m (→ 6th place)

Men's Discus Throw
Roberto Moya 
 Qualification — 62.06 m
 Final — 64.12 m (→  Bronze Medal)
Juan Martínez 
 Qualification — 60.34 m
 Final — 62.64 m (→ 6th place)

Women's 800 metres
Ana Fidelia Quirot
 Heat — 1:59.06
 Semifinal — 2:00.86
 Final — 1:56.80 (→  Bronze Medal)

Women's Discus Throw
 Maritza Marten 
 Qualification — 65.02m
 Final — 70.06m (→  Gold Medal)
 Hilda Ramos 
 Qualification — 62.82m
 Final — 63.80m (→ 6th place)
 Bárbara Hechavarría 
 Qualification — 60.22m (→ did not advance)

Women's High Jump
 Ioamnet Quintero 
 Qualification — 1.92 m
 Final — 1.97 m (→  Bronze Medal)
 Silvia Costa 
 Qualification — 1.92 m
 Final — 1.94 m (→ 5th place)

Baseball

Men's Team Competition:
 Cuba –  Gold Medal (9–0)
Team Roster
 Omar Ajete
 Rolando Arrojo
 José Raúl Delgado
 Giorge Diaz
 José Estrada González
 Osvaldo Fernández
 Lourdes Gourriel
 Alberto Hernández
 Orlando Hernández
 Orestes Kindelán
 Omar Linares
 Germán Mesa
 Víctor Mesa
 Antonio Pacheco
 Juan Padilla
 Juan Pérez
 Luis Ulacia
 Ermidelio Urrutia
 Jorge Valdés
 Lázaro Vargas

Basketball

Women's Team Competition
Preliminary round (group A)
Defeated Unified Team (91–89)
Defeated Brazil (95–88)
Defeated Italy (60–53)
Semifinals
Lost to PR China (70–109)
Bronze Medal Match
Lost to United States (74–88) → 4th place
Team Roster
Andrea Borrell
Ana Hernández
Olga Vigil
Grisel Herrera
Biosotis Lagnó
Yudith Águila
María León
Yamilé Martínez
Dalia Henry
Liset Castillo
Regla Hernández
Milayda Enríquez
Head coach: Manuel Pérez

Boxing

Men's Light Flyweight (– 48 kg)
 Rogelio Marcelo →  Gold Medal
 First round – Defeated Mfamasibili Mnisi (SWZ), RSC-3  
 Second round – Defeated Erdenentsogt Tsogtjargal (MGL), 14:2 
 Quarterfinals – Defeated Rafael Lozano (ESP), 11:3
 Semifinals – Defeated Roel Velasco (PHI), RSCH-1
 Final – Defeated Daniel Petrov (BUL), 20:10

Men's Flyweight (– 51 kg)
 Raúl González →  Silver Medal
 First round – Defeated Leszek Olszewski (POL), 15:7
 Second round – Defeated Moses Malagu (NGR), RSC-2
 Quarterfinals – Defeated David Serradas (VEN), 14:7
 Semifinals – Defeated Timothy Austin (USA) RSC-1
 Final – Lost to Choi Chol-Su (PRK), 2:12

Men's Bantamweight (– 54 kg)
 Joel Casamayor →  Gold Medal
 First round – Defeated Devarajan Venkatesan (IND), 13:7 
 Second round – Defeated Riadh Klai (TUN), 16:11 
 Quarterfinals – Defeated Roberto Jalnaiz (PHI), KO-1
 Semifinals – Defeated Mohamed Achik (MAR), AB-1
 Final – Defeated Wayne McCullough (IRL), 16:8

Men's Featherweight (– 57 kg)
 Eddy Suarez
 First round – Defeated Lee Chil-Gun (PRK), 20:5 
 Second round – Defeated Mohamed Soltani (TUN), RSC-2 (02:53) 
 Quarterfinals – Lost to Faustino Reyes (ESP), 7:17

Men's Lightweight (– 60 kg)
 Julio González Valladares
 First round – Lost to Tontcho Tontchev (BUL), 12:14

Men's Light Welterweight (– 63.5 kg)
 Héctor Vinent →  Gold Medal
 First round – Defeated Edwin Cassiani (COL), 27:4
 Second round – Defeated Andreas Zülow (GER), 14:2 
 Quarterfinals – Defeated Oleg Nikolaev (URS), 26:3 
 Semifinals – Defeated Jyri Kjall (FIN), 13:3 
 Final – Defeated Mark Leduc (CAN), 11:1

Men's Welterweight (– 67 kg)
 Juan Hernández Sierra →  Silver Medal
 First round – Defeated Said Bennajem (FRA), 6:0 
 Second round – Defeated Jun Jin-Chul (KOR), RSC-2 
 Quarterfinals – Defeated Søren Antman (SWE), RSC-2 
 Semifinals – Defeated Aníbal Acevedo (PUR), 11:2 
 Final – Lost to Michael Carruth (IRL), 10:13

Men's Light Middleweight (– 71 kg)
 Juan Carlos Lemus →  Gold Medal
 First round – Defeated Arkadiy Topayev (EUN), 11:0 
 Second round – Defeated Markus Beyer (GER), RSC-1
 Quarterfinals – Defeated Igors Saplavskis (LAT), 12:2 
 Semifinals – Defeated György Mizsei (HUN), 10:2 
 Final – Defeated Orhan Delibaş (NED), 6:1

Men's Middleweight (– 75 kg)
 Ariel Hernández →  Gold Medal
 First round – Defeated Joseph Lareya (GHA), 6:0 
 Second round – Defeated Gilberto Brown (ISV), 13:2 
 Quarterfinals – Defeated Sven Ottke (GER), 14:6 
 Semifinals – Defeated Lee Seung-Bae (KOR), 14:1 
 Final – Defeated Chris Byrd (USA), 12:7

Men's Light Heavyweight (– 81 kg)
 Angel Espinosa
 First round – Defeated Mehmet Gürgen (TUR), RSC-3 
 Second round – Defeated Roberto Castelli (ITA), RSC-1 
 Quarterfinals – Lost to Wojciech Bartnik (POL), 3:9

Men's Heavyweight (– 91 kg)
 Félix Savón →  Gold Medal
 First round – Defeated Krysztof Rojek (POL), RSC-2 
 Second round – Defeated Bert Teuchiert (GER), 11:2 
 Quarterfinals – Defeated Danell Nicholson (USA), 13:11 
 Semifinals – Defeated Arnold Vanderlyde (NED), 23:3
 Final – Defeated David Izonritei (NGR), 14:1

Men's Super Heavyweight (+ 91 kg)
 Roberto Balado →  Gold Medal
 First round – Bye 
 Second round – Defeated Tom Glesby (CAN), 16:2 
 Quarterfinals – Defeated Larry Donald (USA), 10:4 
 Semifinals – Defeated Brian Nielsen (DEN), 15:1 
 Final – Defeated Richard Igbineghu (NGR), 13:2

Canoeing

Cycling

Four male cyclists represented Cuba in 1992.

Men's team pursuit
 Conrado Cabrera
 Eugenio Castro 
 Noël de la Cruz 
 Raúl Domínguez

Men's points race
 Conrado Cabrera

Fencing

Five male fencers represented Cuba in 1992.

Men's foil
 Elvis Gregory
 Guillermo Betancourt
 Oscar García
 Alain Julian

Men's team foil
 Elvis Gregory, Guillermo Betancourt, Oscar García, Tulio Díaz, Hermenegildo García

Judo

Men's Half-Lightweight
Israel Hernández

Men's Lightweight
Ignacio Sayu

Men's Middleweight
Andrés Franco

Men's Half-Heavyweight
Belarmino Salgado

Men's Heavyweight
Frank Moreno

Women's Extra-Lightweight
Amarilis Savón

Women's Half-Lightweight
Legna Verdecia

Women's Lightweight
Driulys González

Women's Half-Middleweight
Ileana Beltrán

Women's Middleweight
Odalis Revé

Women's Half-Heavyweight
Niurka Moreno

Women's Heavyweight
Estela Rodríguez

Rowing

Shooting

Swimming

Men's 100m Backstroke
 Rodolfo Falcón
 Heat – 55.99
 Final – 55.76 (→ 7th place)

Men's 200m Backstroke
 Rodolfo Falcón
 Heat – 2:00.52
 B-Final – 2:00.22 (→ 9th place)

Men's 100m Breaststroke
 Mario González
 Heat – 1:03.53 (→ did not advance, 22nd place)

Men's 200m Breaststroke
 Mario González
 Heat – 2:16.45 (→ did not advance, 18th place)

Table tennis

Volleyball

Men's Team Competition
Preliminary round (group B)
Defeated Netherlands (3–1)
Defeated Algeria (3–0)
Defeated Unified Team (3–1)
Lost to Brazil (1–3)
Defeated South Korea (3–0)
Quarterfinals
Defeated Spain (3–0)
Semifinals
Lost to Netherlands (0–3)
Bronze Medal Match
Lost to United States (1–3) → Fourth place
Team Roster
Félix Millán   
Freddy Brooks   
Idalberto Valdes   
Ihosvany Hernández   
Joël Despaigne  
Lazaro Beltran   
Lazaro Marin   
Nicolas Vives
Osvaldo Hernández   
Raúl Diago
Rodolfo Sánchez   
Abel Sarmientos

Women's Team Competition
Preliminary round (group B)
Defeated PR China (3–1)
Defeated Brazil (3–1)
Defeated Netherlands (3–0)
Semifinals
Defeated United States (3–2)
Final
Defeated Unified Team (3–1) →  Gold Medal
Team Roster
Regla Bell
Mercedes Calderón
Magalys Carvajal
Marlenys Costa
Ana Ibis Fernandez 
Idalmis Gato
Lilia Izquierdo
Norka Latamblet
Mireya Luis
Raisa O'Farrill 
Tania Ortiz
Regla Torres
Head coach: Eugenio Lafita

Water polo

Men's Team Competition
Preliminary round (group B)
 Defeated Greece (10–9)
 Lost to Hungary (11–12)
 Lost to Italy (8–11)
 Lost to the Netherlands (9–11)
 Lost to Spain (10–12)
Classification Matches
 Lost to Australia (5–7)
 Lost to Germany (6–10) → 8th place
Team Roster
 Bárbaro Diaz
 Juan Barreras 
 Norge Blay 
 Pablo Cuesta 
 Jorge Del Valle 
 Marcelo Derauville 
 Lazaro Fernández 
 Ernesto García 
 Juan Hernández Olivera 
 Juan Hernández Silveira 
 Guillermo Martínez 
 Iván Pérez 
 José Ramos

Weightlifting

Men's Middleweight
Pablo Lara
Raúl Mora

Men's Light-Heavyweight
Lino Elias
José Ernesto Heredia

Men's Middle-Heavyweight
Emilio Lara

Men's Heavyweight II
Flavio Villavicencio
Maurys Charón

Men's Super-Heavyweight
Ernesto Aguero

Wrestling

See also
 Cuba at the 1991 Pan American Games

References

Nations at the 1992 Summer Olympics
1992
1992 in Cuban sport